Astonishing the Gods is a novel by Nigerian writer Ben Okri.

On November 5, 2019, the BBC News listed Astonishing the Gods on its list of the 100 most influential novels.

In an interview with The Guardian Okri mentioned that he wrote the novel while on a fast.

References

Novels by Ben Okri
Year of work missing
1995 Nigerian novels